Prevention is an American healthy-lifestyle magazine published by Hearst Corporation featuring articles about health conditions, wellness, food and nutrition, weight loss, fitness, and beauty.

Founded in 1950 by J. I. Rodale and published initially by Rodale, Inc., in Emmaus, Pennsylvania, Prevention grew out of J. I. Rodale's interest in exploring the connection between human health and organic agriculture. The magazine launched with approximately 50,000 subscribers. 

In 2018, Prevention was acquired by Hearst Magazines along with four other Rodale brands: Men's Health, Women's Health, Runner's World, and Bicycling. Today, Prevention is published in both the United States and Australia.

Editor-in-chief timeline
J. I. Rodale (1950–1971)
Robert Rodale (1971–1990)
Mark Bricklin (1991–1997)
Anne Alexander (1997–2000)
Elizabeth Crow (2001–2002)
Rosemary Ellis (2003–2006)
Liz Vaccariello (2006–2010)
Diane Salvatore (2010–2012)
Anne Alexander (2012–2014)
Bruce Kelley (2014–2015)
Barbara O'Dair (2016–2018)
Jane Francisco (2018—present)

Notes

See also

Competitors
Reader's Digest
Health
Guideposts Magazine
WebMD the Magazine
Fitness (defunct)
Shape
Self (defunct)
Redbook (defunct)
Weight Watchers (defunct)
Whole Living (defunct)

External links
Prevention website

1950 establishments in Pennsylvania
Health magazines
Lifestyle magazines published in the United States
Monthly magazines published in the United States
Digests
Magazines established in 1950
Magazines published in Pennsylvania
Prevention
Rodale, Inc.